Harvinder Singh Marwa (born 11 September 1943) is a Kenyan field hockey player. He competed at the 1968 Summer Olympics and the 1972 Summer Olympics. He is the brother of Kenyan hockey international Amarjeet Singh Marwa.

References

External links
 

1943 births
Living people
Kenyan male field hockey players
Olympic field hockey players of Kenya
Field hockey players at the 1968 Summer Olympics
Field hockey players at the 1972 Summer Olympics
Sportspeople from Nairobi
Kenyan people of Indian descent
Kenyan people of Punjabi descent